Luis Lee-Chong is a Chilean former footballer who played as a midfielder.

Club career
As a player, Lee-Chong was a midfielder, and played for Ferroviarios, before going on to play professionally for Trasandino. He also played for Deportes Arica and Deportes Iberia before retiring in 1983 due to a fractured tibia and fibula.

Coaching career
Following his retirement, Lee-Chong founded the escuela de fútbol Recoleta-Chacabuco in 2002; an academy responsible for the development of professional footballers Jeisson Vargas, Carlos Palacios and Pablo Aránguiz. In total, the academy has produced over 50 professional footballers.

Personal life
Lee-Chong's father, Chong Lee Lam (known in Chile as Benito Lee Chong Lam), fled his native China to avoid the rising tensions between China and Japan, as well as the Chinese Civil War, arriving in Chile in 1928. He went on to run a butchers shop in Santiago, and had six children, including Luis, as well as Óscar, who also went on to play football.

His son, Jaime Carreño, and nephew, Felipe Lee-Chong, are also professional footballers.

References

Date of birth unknown
Living people
Chilean people of Chinese descent
Chilean footballers
Association football midfielders
Chilean Primera División players
Primera B de Chile players
Segunda División Profesional de Chile players
San Marcos de Arica footballers
Deportes Iberia footballers